The men's bantamweight event was part of the boxing programme at the 1960 Summer Olympics.  The weight class allowed boxers of up to 54 kilograms to compete. The competition was held from 25 August to 5 September 1960. 32 boxers from 32 nations competed.

Competition format

The competition was a straight single-elimination tournament, with no bronze medal match (two bronze medals were awarded, one to each semifinal loser). There were 33 boxers entered, but the boxer from the Republic of China withdrew at the last minute, too late to change the bracket; therefore, one bout was conducted in the round of 64 and one boxer received a bye in the round of 32.

Results

Results of the bantamweight boxing competition.

Top half

Bottom half

Finals

References

Bantamweight